The article listed the confirmed squad lists for 2007 Women's EuroHockey Nations Championship between August 18 to August 25, 2007.

Pool A

Head coach: Marc Lammers

Head coach: Danny Kerry

Head coach: Gene Muller

Head coach: Franco Nicola

Pool B

Head coach: Michael Behrmann

Head coach: Pablo Usoz

Head coach: Svitlana Makaieva

Head coach: Tahir Zaman

References

Squads
2007